New York Stories is a 1989 American anthology film consisting of three segments with the central theme being New York City.

The first is Life Lessons, directed by Martin Scorsese, written by Richard Price and starring Nick Nolte. The second is Life Without Zoë, directed by Francis Ford Coppola and written by Coppola with his daughter, Sofia Coppola. The last is Oedipus Wrecks, directed, written by and starring Woody Allen. In foreign theatrical releases, the order of the three films was altered, Coppola's being first, followed by Allen's, and finishing with Scorsese's.

The film was screened out of competition at the 1989 Cannes Film Festival.

Plot

Life Lessons
Lionel Dobie is an acclaimed abstract artist who finds himself unable to paint during the days before a scheduled gallery exhibition of his new work. Paulette is Lionel's assistant and former lover. Lionel is still infatuated with her, but Paulette wants only his tutelage, which makes things difficult since they live in the same studio-loft. Paulette dates other people, including a performance artist and a painter.

These deliberate provocations on Paulette's part make Lionel insanely jealous—and fuel his creativity. Lionel and Paulette, it becomes clear, have been using each other: Lionel using her sexually, Paulette using him as a means of entry into the higher spheres of the New York social and art scene. Paulette wants to give up and go home to her parents but Lionel persuades her to stay because New York is where a painter needs to be.

Lionel pours his anxiety and repressed passion into his work. Paintings around the studio show visual metaphors from relations past: stormy skies, burning bridges, and tormented clowns. Lionel realizes that he needs the emotional turmoil of his destructive relationships in order to fuel his art. At the art exhibit, Lionel meets another attractive young woman, a struggling painter. He persuades her to become his assistant and potentially his lover, beginning the cycle anew.

Life Without Zoë
Zoë is a 12-year-old schoolgirl who lives in a luxury hotel. She helps return to an Arab princess a valuable piece of jewelry that the princess had given to Zoë's father and had been subsequently stolen and recovered. Zoë tries to reconcile her divorced mother, a photographer, and father, a flautist.

Oedipus Wrecks
New York lawyer Sheldon Mills has problems with his overly critical mother Sadie Millstein. Sheldon complains constantly to his therapist about her, wishing aloud that she would just disappear. Sheldon takes his shiksa fiancée, Lisa, to meet his mother, who immediately embarrasses him. The three, as well as Lisa's children from a previous marriage, go to a magic show. His mother is invited on stage to be a part of the magician's act. She is put inside a box that has swords stuck through it and she disappears, just as she is supposed to, but then she never reappears.

Although he is furious at first, this development turns out to be great for Sheldon because, with her out of his life, he can finally relax. But soon, to his horror, his mother reappears in the sky over New York City. She begins to annoy Sheldon and Lisa (with the whole city now watching) by constantly talking to strangers about his most embarrassing moments. This puts a strain on his relationship with Lisa, who leaves him. Sheldon is persuaded by his psychiatrist to see a psychic, Treva, to try to get his mother back to reality. Treva's experiments fail, but Sheldon falls for her. When he introduces Treva to his mother, she approves and comes back to Earth.

Cast

Life Lessons
 Nick Nolte as Lionel Dobie
 Rosanna Arquette as Paulette
 Steve Buscemi as Gregory Stark
 Jesse Borrego as Reuben Toro
 Peter Gabriel as himself
 Illeana Douglas as Paulette's friend
 Deborah Harry as girl at Blind Alley

Life Without Zoë
 Heather McComb as Zoë
 Talia Shire as Charlotte
 Giancarlo Giannini as Claudio
 Don Novello as Hector
 Adrien Brody as Mel
 Chris Elliott as robber
 Carmine Coppola as street musician
 Carole Bouquet as Princess Soraya

Oedipus Wrecks
 Woody Allen as Sheldon Mills
 Mae Questel as Mother
 Mia Farrow as Lisa
 Julie Kavner as Treva
 George Schindler as Shandu, the magician
 Larry David as theater manager
 Mike Starr as hardhat
 Ira Wheeler as Mr. Bates
 Kirsten Dunst as Lisa's daughter

Soundtracks

Life Lessons

 "A Whiter Shade of Pale" by Procol Harum
 "Politician" by Cream
 "The Right Time" by Ray Charles
 "Like a Rolling Stone" by Bob Dylan/The Band
 "It Could Happen to You" written by Johnny Burke and Jimmy Van Heusen
 "That Old Black Magic" written by Johnny Mercer and Harold Arlen
 "Stella by Starlight" written by Ned Washington and Victor Young
 "Conquistador" by Procol Harum
 "Nessun dorma" by Mario Del Monaco
 "Sex Kick" by Transvision Vamp
 "What Is This Thing Called Love?" performed by The Hot Club of France with Django Reinhardt and Stéphane Grappelli
 "Bolero de Django" by The Hot Club of France with Django Reinhardt and Stéphane Grappelli

Life Without Zoe
This segment's music was almost written in its entirety by Kid Creole (August Darnell) and performed by Kid Creole and the Coconuts, except where noted.

 "Zoe"
 "Daiquiri Daiquira"
 "Schoolin"
 "Abu"
 "The Robbery"
 "My Love"
 "People Will Talk"
 "Party Girl"
 "Don't Lead Me On"
 "March of the Waiters"
 "Takin' a Holiday"
 "12th Street" by Thick as Thieves
 "Blue Suede Shoes" by Carl Lee Perkins
 "Back to School" by Pianosaurus

Oedipus Wrecks

 "I Want a Girl (Just Like the Girl That Married Dear Old Dad)" by Frankie Carle
 "Mother" by Bernie Leighton
 "Sing, Sing, Sing" by Benny Goodman
 "In a Persian Market" by Wilbur de Paris
 "I'll Be Seeing You" by Liberace
 "I've Found a New Baby" by Wilbur de Paris
 "All the Things You Are" by David Rose & His Orchestra
 "June in January" by David Rose & His Orchestra

Reception

Box office
New York Stories opened on March 10, 1989, earning $432,337 in 12 theaters over its opening weekend. The film went on to gross $10,763,469 domestically playing in 514 theaters.

Critical response
New York Stories holds a 75% "fresh" rating on Rotten Tomatoes from 24 reviews.

Allen and Scorsese's segments of the film have generally been praised. However, Hal Hinson, writing in The Washington Post felt that Coppola's segment was "by far the director's worst work yet." Roger Ebert of Chicago Sun-Times gave the film two and a half stars, saying "New York Stories consists of three films, one good, one bad, one disappointing."  He further explained, "Of the three films, the only really successful one is Life Lessons, the Scorsese story of a middle-age painter and his young, discontented girlfriend. The Coppola, an updated version of the story of Eloise, the little girl who lived in the Plaza Hotel, is surprisingly thin and unfocused. And the Allen, about a 50-year-old man still dominated by his mother, starts well but then takes a wrong turn about halfway through."

Notes

References

External links

 John Walker. "New York Stories: Life Lessons film review". Art Monthly/artdesigncafe. Retrieved 6 January 2012.
 
 
 
 
 The New York Times review

1989 films
1989 comedy-drama films
1989 romantic comedy films
1989 romantic drama films
1980s American films
1980s English-language films
1980s romantic comedy-drama films
American anthology films
American romantic comedy-drama films
Films about fictional painters
Films about Jews and Judaism
Films about lawyers
Films directed by Francis Ford Coppola
Films directed by Martin Scorsese
Films directed by Woody Allen
Films produced by Robert Greenhut
Films scored by Carmine Coppola
Films set in New York City
Films shot in Greece
Films shot in New York City
Films shot in Newark, New Jersey
Films with screenplays by Francis Ford Coppola
Films with screenplays by Richard Price (writer)
Films with screenplays by Sofia Coppola
Films with screenplays by Woody Allen
Touchstone Pictures films